A Girl's Folly is a 1917 American silent comedy film directed by Maurice Tourneur and starring Robert Warwick, Doris Kenyon, June Elvidge, Jane Adair, Chester Barnett, and Johnny Hines. Tourneur also played the director for the film within the film.

Plot
A young girl, who wants more from the environment of her small town, comes across a film crew shooting a western. When the leading man she befriends encourages her to become an actress, she moves to the big city. However, things do not turn out quite the way she planned.

Cast

Production
Several scenes in the film show areas of the Paragon Films studio in Fort Lee, New Jersey, including the film lab, editing room, printing plant, spray chamber, cafeteria, dressing rooms, and film sets.

Preservation
Prints of A Girl's Folly in various grades of completeness are held in several film archives including the Cineteca Del Friuli (Gemona), BFI National Archive, George Eastman Museum Motion Picture Collection, UCLA Film and Television Archive, and Library of Congress, with a complete copy donated from a private collection to the American Film Institute and Library of Congress in 1972. An incomplete print was also found in 1978 in the Dawson Film Find preserved by permafrost.

References

External links

 
 
 Stills and commentary at moviessilently.com
 Advertising material at silentfilmstillarchive.com
 

1917 films
Silent American comedy films
American silent feature films
American black-and-white films
1917 comedy films
Films directed by Maurice Tourneur
World Film Company films
1910s American films